Moses Coit Tyler (August 2, 1835 – December 28, 1900) was an American author and the first full university professor of American history.

Biography
He was born Moses Tyler in Griswold, Connecticut. In his childhood, his family moved several times to Constantia, New York, and several locations in Michigan, settling in Detroit in 1842. In Detroit he attended First Congregational Church. In 1850, at the age of 15 he became a schoolteacher in Romeo, Michigan. The next year he became a bookseller in Chicago.

He entered the University of Michigan in 1852. The next year, a relative from Connecticut financed his transfer to Yale University. He graduated A.B. in 1857 and A.M. in 1863. During his senior year, he met Andrew Dickson White at a Skull and Bones meeting. This became a lifelong personal and professional friendship.

He studied for the Congregational ministry at the Yale Divinity School (1857–1858) and at the Andover Theological Seminary (1858–1859). His first pastorate was at a Congregationalist church in Owego, New York from 1859 to 1860. In 1861 he moved to a larger congregation inPoughkeepsie.

In 1862 he suffered a nervous breakdown. To recover he attended Boston's Normal Institute for Physical Education for six months, where he became a disciple of Diocletian Lewis and his calisthenic training regimens. After recovery, he settled in England and established himself as a lecturer and essayist; initially as an evangelist for Lewis' musical gymnastics, but transitioning to studying and contrasting American and British society.

In 1867 he became professor of English language and literature at the University of Michigan. He held that position until 1881, except in 1873-1874 when he was literary editor of The Christian Union. His disgust with the Henry Ward Beecher Beecher-Tilton Scandal case sent him back to Michigan. Tyler was elected a member of the American Antiquarian Society in 1879.

For much of the 1870s, Andrew Dickson White had been promoting the study of American history at Cornell University, having hired George Washington Greene, William C. Russell, Hermann E. Von Holst, and John Fiske in various roles as visiting professors and lecturers. In 1881, White secured funds for a permanent professorship, and hired his old college friend Tyler. Tyler turned down a competing offer from Columbia University (at double the pay). From 1881 until his death, he was professor of American history and chairman of the Department of History. This was the first full professorship of American history. 

In 1881 he was ordained deacon in the Protestant Episcopal Church and in 1883 priest, but he never undertook regular parochial work.

Work 
Beginning with his first stay in England in the 1860s, Tyler advocated for establishing formal studies of American literature and history. At the University of Michigan, while employed as an English professor, he proposed American literature and history be added to the curriculum. He was self-taught as a historian, and placed high importance on collection and use of primary sources, including 

After noting that White and Cornell had arranged for George Washington Greene to be a visiting professor of American history in the early 1870s, he wrote a series of letters to Andrew White and Benson Lossing on the subject, and proposing himself as a permanent professor of American history at Cornell. Cornell's recent acquisition of Jared Sparks' library made Cornell a desirable institution for the aspiring American historian.

Most important among his works are his valuable and original History of American Literature during the Colonial Time, 1607-1765 (2 vols, 1878; revised in 1897), and Literary History of the American Revolution, 1763-1783 (2 vols, 1897). Supplementary to these two is his Three Men of Letters (1895), containing biographical and critical chapters on George Berkeley, Timothy Dwight and Joel Barlow.

In addition he published:
The Brawnville Papers (1869), a series of essays on physical culture
a revision of Henry Morley's Manual of English Literature (1879)
Christianity and Manliness (1885), essay
In Memoriam: Edgar Kelsey Apgar (1886), privately printed
Patrick Henry (1887), an excellent biography, in the "American Statesmen" series
Glimpses of England; Social, Political, Literary (1898), a selection from his sketches written while abroad.

Among his students at Cornell were Charles Hull (who succeeded him at Cornell as Professor of American History) and Charles A. Beard.

His papers are archived at the Cornell University Library. Selections were published by his daughter in 1911.

Personal Life 
In 1862, at the request of his cousin, Dr. Daniel T. Coit of Boston, he adopted the name "Coit" as his middle name.

He married Jeannette Gilbert of New Haven, and had three children: Jessica, Edward, and Ned. He spent many professional years and holidays away from them.

References

External links
 Moses Coit Tyler on Encyclopaeida Britannica
 
 
 
 

1835 births
1900 deaths
People from Griswold, Connecticut
American literary critics
American essayists
American biographers
Cornell University Department of History faculty
University of Michigan alumni
19th-century American journalists
American male journalists
American male essayists
19th-century American male writers
19th-century essayists
Members of the American Antiquarian Society
Yale Divinity School alumni
Yale College alumni
American male biographers
Members of the American Academy of Arts and Letters